was a private junior college in Mishima, Shizuoka, Japan. It was founded as a junior college in 1965, and was closed in 2009.

See also 
 List of junior colleges in Japan

References

External links
 Concept of Morita Therapy : The Training for Morita Shinkeishitsu 

Japanese junior colleges
Universities and colleges in Shizuoka Prefecture
Private universities and colleges in Japan
1965 establishments in Japan
Educational institutions disestablished in 2009